An Ozark Romance is a 1918 American short comedy film featuring Harold Lloyd. Prints of the film survive at the film archive of the Museum of Modern Art.

Cast
 Harold Lloyd
 Snub Pollard
 Bebe Daniels
 William Blaisdell
 Sammy Brooks
 William Gillespie
 Helen Gilmore
 Lew Harvey
 Gus Leonard
 James Parrott
 Charles Stevenson (as Charles E. Stevenson)

See also
 Harold Lloyd filmography

References

External links

1918 films
American silent short films
1918 comedy films
1918 short films
American black-and-white films
Films directed by Alfred J. Goulding
Silent American comedy films
American comedy short films
1910s American films